Gary Cully (born 26 January 1996) is an Irish professional boxer who has held the Irish lightweight title since 2020. As an amateur he won a gold medal at the 2013 European Youth Championships and fought at the 2014 Youth World Championships.

Amateur career

Cully began boxing at the age of seven at St David's Boxing Club in Naas. He won gold in the flyweight event of the 2013 European Youth Championships in Rotterdam, defeating Masud Yusifzada of Azerbaijan in the final and taking home the Best Boxer Award. He then represented his country at the 2014 AIBA Youth World Championships in Sofia, making his debut in the bantamweight class. He lost his first match by split decision to Ukrainian Voldymyr Fedora, who would eventually fall to Peter McGrail in the quarter-finals.

He was also a six-time underage Irish national champion and won the 2016 Haringey Box Cup in London, being named Best Overall Boxer in the process. Cully was defeated by future pro stablemate David Oliver Joyce in the quarter-finals of the 2016 Irish Elite Championships which ended any hopes of attempting to qualify for the Rio Olympics.

Having had ambitions of qualifying for the 2020 Olympics, Cully would become disillusioned with amateur boxing after rule changes and controversies such as compatriot Michael Conlan's loss to Vladimir Nikitin at Rio 2016.

Professional career
In the summer of 2017, Cully signed with MTK Global and turned professional, linking up with trainer Pete Taylor - father of Katie. He made his debut on 16 September 2017, stopping Hungarian journeyman Gyula Tallosi inside a minute at the Devenish Complex in Belfast. A busy start to his pro career saw Cully then fight twice at the SSE Arena in Belfast, scoring impressive wins over durable Englishmen Josh Thorne and Kane Baker.

Following two more undercard wins in Belfast in the first half of 2018, Cully began to step up his level of opposition. First he would score a statement third-round stoppage over game Wearsider Jordan Ellison on 5 October 2018 at the Titanic Exhibition Centre before knocking out Tanzanian  Mohammed Kambuluta (18–5, 7 KO) in the first round at the same venue on 7 December 2018 to improve to 7–0 as a pro.

The lilywhite had an uneventful 2019, only fighting twice due to a knuckle gash and missing out on a clash with French champion Renald Garrido as a result. After months of looking for a challenger for the Irish lightweight title, he finally won the vacant national belt on 1 February 2020 when he faced unbeaten local prospect Joe Fitzpatrick (10–0, 7 KO) at the Ulster Hall in Belfast. Cully would stop the 2014 Commonwealth Games silver medalist by first-round TKO for his first title.

Cully was expected to face Kieran Gething on 26 August 2020. Gething later withdrew from the bout, and was replaced by Craig Woodruff, who stepped in on 18-days notice. Cully won the fight on points. Six months later, on 13 March 2021, Cully faced Viktor Kotochigov for the vacant WBO European lightweight title. He made quick work of the Kazakh, as he won the fight by a second-round technical knockout. Cully faced Viorel Simion on 25 June 2021, in his second and final fight of the year. Simion retired from the bout at the end of the third round.

Professional boxing record

References

External links
 

Living people
1996 births
Irish male boxers
Lightweight boxers
Light-welterweight boxers
Southpaw boxers
People from Naas